The 1984-85 Georgia Tech Yellow Jackets men's basketball team represented the Georgia Institute of Technology during the 1984–85 NCAA Division I men's basketball season. Led by head coach Bobby Cremins, the team finished the season with an overall record of 27-8 (9-5 ACC). The team earned a share of the ACC regular season title, won the ACC tournament, and reached the East Regional final of the NCAA tournament before falling to Georgetown, 60–54.

Roster

Schedule and results 

|-
!colspan=9 style=| Regular season

|-
!colspan=12 style=| ACC Tournament

|-
!colspan=12 style=| NCAA Tournament

Rankings

References 

Georgia Tech Yellow Jackets men's basketball seasons
Georgia Tech
Georgia Tech
1984 in sports in Georgia (U.S. state)
1985 in sports in Georgia (U.S. state)